Royle Eldon Stillman (born January 2, 1951) is an American former professional baseball player whose career lasted for 3 seasons (1975–1977).

Beginnings
An outfielder, he appeared in 75 Major League Baseball games, and played all or part of three seasons (– ) for the Baltimore Orioles and Chicago White Sox.

Draft
Originally drafted out of North Torrance High School by the Los Angeles Dodgers in  during the 22nd round, the native of Santa Monica, California, played in the Dodger farm system for three years, rising to the Double-A level. He was acquired along with Doyle Alexander, Bob O'Brien and Sergio Robles by the Baltimore Orioles from the Dodgers for Frank Robinson and Pete Richert at the Winter Meetings on December 2, 1971.

Minor Leagues
Stillman spent 3 more seasons in the minors — batting over .300 twice — before his recall to Baltimore in June 1975.  In his debut on June 22, he pinch hit for Doug DeCinces and struck out against Luis Tiant of the Boston Red Sox. He returned to the Triple-A Rochester Red Wings until his September recall, and he collected six hits in 13 at bats during that late-season trial to finish with a .429 MLB batting average.

Late career
Stillman made the Orioles' roster in  but collected only two hits in 22 at-bats in part-time duty, largely as a pinch hitter, before returning to Rochester. His 33 MLB hits also included seven doubles and one triple.

References

External links

Major League Baseball outfielders
Baltimore Orioles players
Chicago White Sox players
Ogden Dodgers players
Bakersfield Dodgers players
Albuquerque Dukes players
Asheville Orioles players
Rochester Red Wings players
San Jose Missions players
Spokane Indians players
Ogden A's players
Salt Lake City Gulls players
Baseball players from Santa Monica, California
1951 births
Living people